Theodor Friedrich Julius Basiner (3 January 1816–14 October 1862) was a Baltic German botanist who lived and worked mainly in Imperial Russia.

Life and work
Theodor Friedrich Julius Basiner was born in Tartu, present-day Estonia, and studied at Tartu University between 1836 and 1840. In 1843 he became a conservator at the Botanical Garden in Saint Petersburg. He kept this position until 1845, when he became the institution's librarian. In 1849 he moved to a new position in Kiev, present-day Ukraine. In 1842-43 he made a scientific journey to Khiva in present-day Uzbekistan. He died in Vienna, Austria.

Selected writings
 Naturwissenschaftliche Reise durch die Kirgisensteppe nach Chiva

References

1816 births
1862 deaths
Baltic-German people
University of Tartu alumni
Scientists from the Russian Empire